George Bisset or Bissett may refer to:
George Bisset (footballer) (born 1943), Australian rules footballer
George Bissett (footballer) (1896–1946), Scottish footballer
George Bissett (cricketer) (1905–1965), South African sportsman
Maurice George Bisset (1757–1821), involved in the criminal conversation trial of Sir Richard Worsley, 7th Baronet and his wife